List of French Air and Space Force bases.

Active bases

Metropolitan France

Northern region (RAN: Région Aérienne Nord)

Southern region (RAS: Région Aérienne Sud)

French overseas departments and territories

Foreign countries

Inactive bases

See also 
 List of airports in France
List of British Army installations

References

External links 
 List of air bases, appendix of the budget bill for 2006, French Senate

 
 
French
Air and Space Force bases